

Gerhard Feyerabend (29 April 1898 – 6 November 1965) was a German general in the Wehrmacht of Nazi Germany during World War II who commanded several divisions. He was a recipient of the Knight's Cross of the Iron Cross. Feyerabend surrendered to the Soviet forces in the Courland Pocket; he was released in 1947.

Awards

 German Cross in Gold on 30 January 1943 as Oberst im Generalstab (in the General Staff) of XXVII. Armeekorps
 Knight's Cross of the Iron Cross on 5 April 1945 as Generalleutnant and commander of 11. Infanterie-Division

References

Citations

Bibliography

 
 

1898 births
1965 deaths
Military personnel from Königsberg
Lieutenant generals of the German Army (Wehrmacht)
German Army personnel of World War I
Recipients of the clasp to the Iron Cross, 1st class
Recipients of the Gold German Cross
Recipients of the Knight's Cross of the Iron Cross
German prisoners of war in World War II held by the Soviet Union
German Army generals of World War II